Nicola Lagioia (born 1973) is an Italian writer.

Born in Bari, Lagioia debuted as a novelist in 2001 with Tre sistemi per sbarazzarsi di Tolstoj (senza risparmiare se stessi). With his novel Riportando tutto a casa he won several awards, including the 2010 Viareggio Prize. In 2013 and in 2014 he was among the film selectors of the Venice International Film Festival. In 2015 he won the Strega Prize with the novel La ferocia (a.k.a. "The ferocity").

References 

1973 births
Living people
People from Bari
21st-century Italian novelists
Strega Prize winners
Viareggio Prize winners
Italian male novelists
21st-century Italian male writers